Mohammad Ghazi ( – 27 November 2019), known by his pen name Ghazi Sial and by an honorific title in Pashto literature as Baba Sandara, was a Pakistani poet and Pashto folk song writer. He wrote sixteen books in Pashto language.

Awards and recognition 
Government of Pakistan conferred Pride of Performance award in 2006 upon him in recognition of his literary contribution to Pashto poetry.

Biography
Mohammad Ghazi was born in 1933 at Kotka Akundan village of Bannu District, Khyber Pakhtunkhwa. He learned classics in Pashto, Arabic and Persian language from his father, Abdul Ghafoor Shah, who was a literary figure and a noted religious scholar. Mohammad Ghazi started composing Pashto folk songs in his late teens. Then he worked for Radio Pakistan at Peshawar for 30 years where he used to write Pashto folk songs. His books Banzey, Kashmala, Mangarai and Zama Sandaray Sta Da Para are among the popular Pashto poetic works he wrote during his literary career. 

His folk songs were sung by popular Pashto-language vocalists including Zarsanga, Gulnar Begum, Kishwar Sultana among others. He also wrote scripts, storylines and dialogues for nearly 50 Pashto films.

He was recognized as a prominent poet both in Pakistan and in Afghanistan.

References

Pashtun people
People from Bannu District
1933 births
2019 deaths
Pashto-language writers
Pakistani poets
Pashtun writers
Pashto-language poets
Recipients of the Pride of Performance
Pakistani songwriters